His Name Is Sukhe-Bator, is a 1942 Soviet drama film directed by Iosif Kheifits and Aleksandr Zarkhi.

Plot 
The film tells about the founder of the Mongolian People's Revolutionary Party, the leader of the Mongolian People's Revolution - Damdin Sukhe-Bator.

Starring 
 Nikolay Cherkasov as Baron Ungern
 Semyon Goldshtab as Josef Stalin
 Maksim Shtraukh as V.I. Lenin
 Lev Sverdlin

References

External links 
 

1942 films
1940s Russian-language films
Soviet black-and-white films
Soviet drama films
1942 drama films